Nortonville is a home rule-class city in Hopkins County, Kentucky, in the United States. The population was 1,204 as of the 2010 census.

History
Nortonville owes its existence to the railroad industry and is named for Eckstein Norton, a Kentucky-born investment banker who started as a clerk in a country store in Russellville, Kentucky, in 1846. Norton participated in the creation of the Elizabethtown and Paducah Railroad in the late 1860s (east-west tracks). He then purchased  of land in what would become "Norton Village", later changed to "Nortonville" around 1900. Norton became a shipping agent for the Illinois Central Railroad, which eventually acquired the Elizabethtown & Paducah Railroad. The north-south railroad, named the Evansville, Henderson and Nashville, was completed through Nortonville in 1872. It was purchased in a foreclosure sale in 1879 by the Louisville and Nashville Railroad. Norton became president of the L&N Railroad on October 6, 1886. By 1886, Nortonville was one of only nine towns in the L&N system to have a steam hoist to unload and transfer freight. By then, the city was concentrated around a junction of the IC and L&N Railroads. Nortonville saw growth after 1902, when investors purchased land from the Norton heirs and opened a shaft coal mine as the Nortonville Coal Company. They also operated an electric power plant.

Nortonville implemented its first water system in 1936 and paved its streets in 1956. A centralized sewage treatment system was built in the late 1970s, opening an opportunity for continued growth. The Nortonville City Hall occupies the well-maintained 1930s high school building, which was built by the WPA.

Geography
Nortonville is located in southeastern Hopkins County at  (37.187660, -87.456032). U.S. Route 41 passes through the eastern and southern parts of the city, leading north  to Madisonville, the county seat, and south  to Hopkinsville. U.S. Route 62 passes through the northern part of Nortonville, leading east  to Greenville and west  to Dawson Springs.

Interstate 69 follows the Western Kentucky Parkway west from the interchange towards Eddyville and the Pennyrile Parkway north towards Henderson.

Demographics

As of the census of 2000, there were 1,264 people, 525 households, and 363 families residing in the city. The racial makeup of the city was 96.44% White, 2.06% Black or African American, 0.55% Native American, 0.08% from other races, and 0.87% from two or more races. Hispanic or Latino of any race were 0.87% of the population.

There were 525 households, out of which 28.2% had children under the age of 18 living with them, 54.1% were married couples living together, 12.2% had a female householder with no husband present, and 30.7% were non-families. 28.4% of all households were made up of individuals, and 13.1% had someone living alone who was 65 years of age or older. The average household size was 2.41 and the average family size was 2.93.

In the city, the population was spread out, with 24.1% under the age of 18, 8.8% from 18 to 24, 29.0% from 25 to 44, 23.0% from 45 to 64, and 15.1% who were 65 years of age or older. The median age was 36 years. For every 100 females, there were 95.1 males. For every 100 females age 18 and over, there were 89.0 males.

The median income for a household in the city was $27,222, and the median income for a family was $31,466. Males had a median income of $27,986 versus $17,176 for females. The per capita income for the city was $13,179. About 17.9% of families and 20.3% of the population were below the poverty line, including 27.1% of those under age 18 and 13.1% of those age 65 or over.

Education
Local schools include Southside Elementary; South Hopkins Middle School and Hopkins County Central High School.

References

External links
 
 City of Nortonville official website

Cities in Hopkins County, Kentucky
Cities in Kentucky